Margaret Ackman was a Guyanese politician and a founding member of the People’s National Congress Reform (PNCR).

Early life
Margaret Ackman was born in the family of Frederick Ackman, a politician of the People's Progressive Party.

Career
Ackman was one of the founding members of the socialist People’s National Congress Reform and from 1969 to 1980, she represented PNCR in the Guyanese parliament. In June 1953, Ackman was elected the president of Women's Progressive Organisation's permanent committee. Fondly referred as "Madam Pandit", she was also an assistant general secretary in the party and president of Business & Professional Women's Club of Georgetown. 

After Patricia Limerick resigned from the Parliament, Ackman was made the government's whip, a post she held till 1973 before being appointed parliamentary secretary in Prime Minister Forbes Burnham's office (1973–80).

Personal life
On the insistence of a PRO of People's Temple Cult, Ackman had visited Jonestown just a few days before the mass suicide took place. She died on 29 August 2013 at her residence in New York City and is survived by her two children.  Her son Keith Scott became the leader of the National Front Alliance.

References

2013 deaths
Guyanese women in politics